Ishtarlay or Ashtarlay, is a district in the Daykundi Province of Afghanistan, located in the isolated central part of the country. It was created in 2005 from  Daykundi district.

Demographics 
The population of Ashtarlay is made up of ethnic Hazaras.

See also 

 Districts of Afghanistan
 Hazarajat

References

External links 
 Video: B-Roll, Daykundi Province Handover to GIRoA  by Defense Video & Imagery Distribution System

Ashtarlay
Hazarajat